Jason Walker (born 21 February 1984) is an English semi-professional footballer who plays as a striker for Northern Premier League club Lancaster City. He previously played for Dundee, Greenock Morton, Morecambe, Luton Town, York City, Östersund, Forest Green Rovers, Southport, Barrow, Chorley and Workington.

Club career

Early career
Born in Barrow-in-Furness, Cumbria, Walker grew in Flookburgh and attended Cartmel Priory School. He was playing for Cartmel in the North Lancashire and District Football League at the age of 16 when he was spotted by a Dundee scout. He signed for the Scottish Premier League team's youth system on a two-year scholarship straight from school after playing three games on trial. He then had two years on a professional contract before being released in May 2004 with the club in administration, bringing to an end four years with Dundee. He subsequently joined Scottish Second Division side Greenock Morton in July 2004. He left the club and signed for Conference National side Morecambe in January 2007 after training with the team. He scored in the 90th minute on his first team debut, a 5–0 victory at home to Mangotsfield United in the FA Trophy second round on 13 January 2007, after entering the match as a 65th minute substitute. Following the game, manager Sammy McIlroy said "Jason took his goal really well. He could be a good asset for us".

Barrow
Walker was released by Morecambe on 8 March 2007 and one day later signed for Conference North side Barrow. He scored 13 goals in 48 games in the 2007–08 season as Barrow won promotion to the Conference Premier via the Conference North play-offs. In the 2008–09 season he was Barrow's top scorer with 12 goals in the league, and scored Barrow's goal in their 2–1 defeat by Middlesbrough in the FA Cup third round.

Walker was allowed to go on trial with Championship side Doncaster Rovers in July 2009, having impressed their manager Sean O'Driscoll in a pre-season friendly against his side. However, despite Walker scoring in two trial games, Doncaster did not follow up their interest and he returned to Barrow for the 2009–10 season.

On 20 March 2010, Walker scored twice as Barrow beat Salisbury City 2–1 in the second leg of the FA Trophy semi-final, which gave Barrow a 3–1 win on aggregate and therefore progression to the Final at Wembley Stadium. Barrow faced Conference Premier champions Stevenage Borough in the Final on 8 May 2010 and Walker scored the winning goal with a 25-yard "wonder strike" in a 2–1 victory after extra time.

Luton Town
Walker signed for fellow Conference Premier side Luton Town on 17 November 2010, initially on loan, with a view to a permanent transfer in January 2011. He scored on his Luton debut with a header from Matthew Barnes-Homer's cross and earlier in the match assisted a Jake Howells goal in a 5–1 win at home to Histon on 20 November 2010.

The permanent switch for an undisclosed fee, believed to be around £45,000, was completed on 5 January 2011, with Walker signing a one-and-a-half-year contract. His final act as a Luton player was to miss a crucial penalty kick in the 2011 Conference Premier play-off Final penalty shoot-out defeat to AFC Wimbledon at the City of Manchester Stadium on 21 May 2011, with his chipped effort being saved by goalkeeper Seb Brown. He finished the season with six goals in 29 appearances for Luton.

York City

Eight months after joining Luton, Walker signed for Conference Premier rivals York City on a two-year contract on 16 June 2011, with the officially undisclosed fee being revealed by Luton as £60,000. He scored a penalty and a 90th minute winning goal with a header on his debut, a 2–1 victory away at Ebbsfleet United in the opening game of the 2011–12 season on 13 August 2011. Walker was handed a three-match suspension after being red carded during a 0–0 draw away at former club Barrow on 19 November 2011 for a tackle on Jason Owen during stoppage time. Walker won a second FA Trophy in the 2012 Final with York at Wembley on 12 May 2012, in which the side beat Newport County 2–0. Eight days later he played in the 2–1 victory over his former club Luton in the 2012 Conference Premier play-off Final at Wembley, seeing York return to the Football League after an eight-year absence with promotion to League Two.

Walker started York's game away at League One Doncaster Rovers in the League Cup first round in the opening game of the 2012–13 season on 11 August 2012, which the side lost 4–2 in a penalty shoot-out following a 1–1 draw after extra time. After converting Jonathan Smith's header, his first goal of the season came in the following game, a 3–1 defeat at home to Wycombe Wanderers on 18 August 2012, which was York's first Football League fixture since their promotion. He completed the season having scored nine goals in 48 games before being released by York on 29 April 2013.

Östersunds FK
Walker signed for Swedish Superettan side Östersund on 1 July 2013 and made his debut in a 2–0 away defeat to Falkenbergs FF on 20 July.

Forest Green Rovers
Walker joined Forest Green Rovers in the Conference Premier on 22 January 2014, signing a contract until the end of the 2013–14 season. He made his debut for the club on 25 January 2014, coming on as a substitute for Lee Hughes on 86 minutes in a 3–0 home win against Chester. After making two appearances for Forest Green, Walker signed for Conference Premier rivals Southport on 27 February 2014, on a loan deal until 26 March. He scored on his debut, in a 3–0 home win over Dartford on 1 March 2013. On 24 March 2014, it was announced that Walker had extended his loan with Southport until the end of the season. After scoring 6 times in 10 appearances for Southport, he was recalled by Forest Green on 20 April 2014 after an injury crisis at the club. On 28 April 2014, it was announced that he had been released by Forest Green.

Return to Barrow
Walker rejoined Barrow on a three-year contract on 19 May 2014, with the club by this time playing in the Conference North. Walker was part of the Barrow team who won the Conference North title in the 2014–15 season by beating Lowestoft 3–2 on the final day of the season.

Chorley
Upon his release by Barrow Walker signed for National League North side Chorley.

International career
Walker became the first Barrow player since the early 1990s to earn a call-up to the England C team after being included in the squad to face the Malta under-21 team in February 2009. He started the game alongside Barrow teammate Paul Brown, with England winning the match 4–0, although he was substituted at half time for Adam Boyes.

Career statistics

Honours
Barrow
Conference North play-offs: 2008
FA Trophy: 2009–10

York City
Conference Premier play-offs: 2012
FA Trophy: 2011–12

References

External links

Jason Walker profile at Barrow A.F.C.

1984 births
Living people
Footballers from Barrow-in-Furness
English footballers
English expatriate footballers
England semi-pro international footballers
Association football forwards
Dundee F.C. players
Greenock Morton F.C. players
Morecambe F.C. players
Barrow A.F.C. players
Luton Town F.C. players
York City F.C. players
Östersunds FK players
Forest Green Rovers F.C. players
Southport F.C. players
Scottish Football League players
National League (English football) players
English Football League players
Superettan players
Expatriate footballers in Sweden
English expatriate sportspeople in Sweden
Lancaster City F.C. players
Workington A.F.C. players
Chorley F.C. players
Footballers from Cumbria